Andrew C. Middleton (April 5, 1824 Rutland, Jefferson County, New York – 1909) was an American politician from New York.

Life
He was the son of Samuel Middleton (1796–1873) and Seraph Middleton (1802–1883). He attended the common schools, and then worked on his father's farm and taught school.

He was Superintendent Common Schools of the Town of Rutland from 1849 to 1851; and Supervisor of the Town of Rutland from 1858 to 1860, and in 1868.

He was a member of the New York State Senate (18th D.) in 1874 and 1875, nominated on a reform ticket by a convention of farmers and endorsed by the Liberal Republicans and the Democrats.

He was buried at the Brookside Cemetery in Watertown.

References
Life Sketches of Government Officers and Members of the Legislature of the State of New York in 1875 by W. H. McElroy and Alexander McBride (pg. 88ff) [e-book]

External links

1824 births
1909 deaths
New York (state) state senators
People from Jefferson County, New York
19th-century American politicians